In the police forces of India, an Assistant of sub-inspector (ASI) is a non-gazetted police officer ranking above a police head constable and below a Sub-inspector. The rank insignia for an ASI is one star, with a red and blue striped ribbon at the outer edge of the shoulder straps. He/she can be an Investigating officer. A.S.I.  is often the officer in charge of Police Outposts or "phari" and Investigation Centres.
Some police station they carry incharge of GD duty. They make report of incidents for senior officers.

In Police Stations ASI are usually in charge of armouries and in training centres they are the Chief Drill Officer. In Armed Police and CRPF/BSF/ITBP/CISF they are Platoon second in charge after the SI and are assigned the staff/administrative charge of the platoon. 

It's the entry rank in the officers grade in the police and paramilitary services. usually the ASI is the incharge of border patrol platoon in the border guarding forces like BSF. Also prior to 6th central pay commission there is no rank of ASI in the paramilitary forces which is later introduced. Still in some paramilitary forces there is no ASI rank like SSB etc.

Police ranks of India

What is ASI above Head Constable in Police Forces of India Rank Insignia A star with a red and blue striped ribbon on the outer edge of the shoulder straps.